This is a listing of the undergraduate and post-graduate colleges that are affiliated with University of Calicut as of 24 July 2018. Colleges that have establishment years listed as a range (e.g. 2003–04) are listed with the preceding year (2003).

Kozhikode district

Arts, science, and commerce

 Government College, Madappally, Vatakara-2, Kozhikode (est. 1958)
 Government College, Meenchantha Kozhikode (est. 1964)
 Sayyid Abdul Rahman Bafaqi Thangal Memorial (S.A.R.B.T.M). Govt. College, Koyilandy, Kozhikode (est. 1975)
 C.K.G. Memorial Government College, Perambra, Kozhikode (est. 1975)
 Government College, Kodanchery, Kozhikode (est. 1980)
 Government College, Mokeri, Kozhikode (est. 1981)
 Zamorin's Guruvayurappan College, Kozhikode (est. 1877)
 Malabar Christian College, Kozhikode (est. 1909)
 Farook College, Kozhikode (est. 1948)
 Providence Women's College, Kozhikode (est. 1952)
 St. Joseph's College, Devagiri, Kozhikode (est. 1956)
 Sree Narayana Guru College, Kozhikode (est. 1968)
 Mohamed Abdurahiman Memorial Orphanage College (MAMO), Mukkam, Kozhikode (est. 1982)
 R. Sankar Memorial SNDP Yogam Arts & Science College, Koyilandy, Kozhikode (est. 1995)
 Savithri Devi Saboo Memorial Women's College, Kozhikode (est. 1995)
 AWH Special College, Kozhikode (est. 1995)
 A.V. Abdurahiman Haji Arts and Science College, Kozhikode (est. 2002)
 MES College, Kozhikode (est. 2002)
 Dayapuram Arts and Science College for Women, Kozhikode (est. 2002)
 MET College, Kozhikode (est. 2002)
 Sree Narayana College, Vatakara, Kozhikode (est. 2003)
 Baithul Izza Arts & Science College, Kozhikode (est. 2003)
 Little Flower Institute of Social Sciences & Health, Kozhikode (est. 2003)
 M.H.E.S. College of Science & Technology, Kozhikode (est. 2003)
 Ilahiya Arts and Science College, Kozhikode (est. 2005)
 JDT Islam Arts & Science College, Kozhikode (est. 2005)
 KMO Arts & Science College, Kozhikode (est. 2005)
 M.E.S. Arts & Science College, Kozhikode (est. 2005)
 National College of Arts & Science, Kozhikode (est. 2005)
 Holy Cross Institute of Management & Technology, Kozhikode (est. 2007)
 Markaz College of Arts & Science, Kozhikode (est. 2008)
 Darul Huda Arts & Science College, Nadapuram, Kozhikode (est. 2009)
 Silver Arts & Science College, Perambra, Kozhikode (est. 2010)
 Malabar College of Arts and Science, Moodadi, Koyilandi, Kozhikode,  (est. 2010)
 St. Xavier's Arts & Science College, Kozhikode (est. 2011)
 Ideal College of Arts & Science, Kuttiadi, Kozhikode (est. 2011)
 Vayalil Kunhali Haji Memorial Orphanage College of Arts & Science for Women, Mukkam, Kozhikode (est. 2012)
 MH Arts & Science College, Kuttiadi, Kozhikode (est. 2012)
 CSI Christian Muller Women's College, Vatakara, Kozhikode (est. 2012)
 Muslim Orphanages’ College of Arts and Science, Kuruvattur, Kozhikode (est. 2012)
 Co-operative Arts & Science College, Vatakara, Kozhikode (est. 2013)
 KMCT Arts & Science College, Kozhikode (est. 2013)
 Sree Gokulam Arts & Science College, Balussery, Kozhikode (est. 2013)
 Sree Narayana Guru College of Advanced Studies, Chelannur, Kozhikode (est. 2013)
 Darunnujoom College of Arts & Science, Perambra, Kozhikode
 SNES College of Arts, Commerce & Management, Kunnamangalam, Kozhikode (est. 2013)
 Peekay CICS Arts & Science College, Mathara, Kozhikode (est. 2013)
 SI Women's College of Arts and Science, Parakkadavu, Kozhikode (est. 2013)
 Don Bosco College, Mukkam, Kozhikode (est. 2013)
 CHMKM Govt. Arts & Science College, Koduvally, Kozhikode (est. 2013)
 Dr B R Ambedkar Memorial Government Arts & Science College, Balussery, Kozhikode  (est. 2013)
 Govt. Arts & Science College, Nadapuram, Kozhikode (est. 2014)
 Alphonsa College, Thiruvambady, Kozhikode (est. 2014)
 Al Irshad Arts & Science College for Women, Kozhikode (est. 2014)
 Golden Hills Arts & Science College, Kozhikode (est. 2014)
 Gurudeva College of Advanced Studies, Koyilandy, Kozhikode (est. 2014)
 Kunnamangalam Govt. Arts and Science College, Chathamangalam, Kozhikode (est. 2014)
 Malabar Arts & Science College for Women, Nadapuram, Kozhikode  (est. 2014)
 Mahlara Arts & Science College, Mavoor, Kozhikode (est. 2015)
 Educos Arts & Science College, Nadupoyil, Kozhikode  (est. 2015)
 Hi-Tech Arts & Science College, Vattoli, Kozhikode (est. 2015)
 Malabar TMS College of Management Technology, Kunnamangalam, Kozhikode  (est. 2015)
 S.M.l Arts & Science College, Vatakara, Kozhikode (est. 2015)
 PVS College of Arts & Science, Pantheerankavu, Kozhikode
 Kadathanad Arts & Science College, Vatakara, Kozhikode

College of Physical Education
 Government College of Physical Education, Kozhikode (est. 2008)

College of Applied Sciences
College of Applied Sciences, Kozhikode- (est. 1993)
 College of Applied Science, Nadapuram, Kozhikode (est. 2005)
 College of Applied Sciences, Mukkam, Kozhikode (est. 2008)
 College of Applied Science, Thamarassery, Kozhikode (est. 2012)

Engineering, MBA, and MCA colleges
 Government Engineering College, Kozhikode (est. 1999)
College of Applied Sciences, Kozhikode- (est. 1993)
 AWH Engineering College, Kozhikode (est. 2001)
 KMCT College of Engineering, Manassery, Kozhikode (est. 2001)
 National Institute of Electronics and Information Technology (NIELIT), Calicut, Kozhikode
 Farook Institute of Management, Kozhikode (est. 2005)
 KMCT College of Engineering for Women, Mukkam, Kozhikode (est. 2009)
 SNES IMSAR (Institute of Management Studies and Research), Kunnamangalam, Kozhikode (est. 2009)
 M. Dasan Institute of Technology, Ulliyeri, Kozhikode (est. 2012)
 KMCT College of Architecture, Kallanthode, Kozhikode (est. 2013)
 KMCT College of Architecture, Manassery, Kozhikode (est. 2013)
 MES College of Architecture, Kakkodi, Kozhikode (est. 2013)
 Avani Institute of Design, Kozhikode (est. 2015)
 LEAD College of Management (Est. 2011)

Training colleges
 Govt. College of Teacher Education, Kozhikode (est. 1950)
 Farook Training College, Feroke, Kozhikode (est. 1961)
 Meppayur Salafi College of Teacher Education, Kozhikode (est. 1995)
 AWH College of Education, Kozhikode (est. 1996)
 Sree Narayana College of Teacher Education, Chelannur, Kozhikode (est. 2002)
 CICS College of Teacher Education, Kozhikode (est. 2004)
 T.I.M. Training College (Unaided), Nadapuram, Kozhikode (est. 2004)
 Bhavan's Ramakrishna Institute of Teacher Education, Kozhikode (est. 2004)
 Providence College of Teacher Education for Women, Malaparamba, Kozhikode  (est. 2005)
 KMCT College of Education, Chathamangalam, Kozhikode (est. 2005)
 Mercy College of Teacher Education, Vatakara  (est. 2006)
 Mother Teresa College of Teacher Education, Perambra (est. 2006)
 Oriental College of Teacher Education Kozhikode (est. 2007)
 KET College of Teacher Education, Kozhikode (est. 2007)
 SSM College of Teacher Education, Kozhikode (est. 2008)
 KMO College of Teacher Education, Koduvally, Kozhikode (est. 2010)

Law colleges 
 Government Law College, Kozhikode (est. 1970)
 Markaz Law College, Kaithapoyil, Kozhikode (est. 2014)

Arabic / Oriental title colleges 
 Sunniyya Arabic College,Chennamangallur, Kozhikode
 Rouzathul Uloom Arabic College, Kozhikode (est. 1942) (sister organization to Farook College)
 Rahmaniya Arabic College, Katameri, Kozhikode (est. 2002)
 Jalaliya Women's Arabic College, Kozhikode (est. 2002)
 Darul Ma-Arifa Arabic College, Puthupady, Kozhikode (est. 2003)
 Baithul Izza Arabic College, Kozhikode (est. 2005)
 Saquafathul Islam Arabic College, Kozhikode (est. 2011)
 Salafiyya Arabic College, Koyilandi, Kozhikode (est. 2012)
 Al-Furqan Arabic College, Nadapuram, Kozhikode (est. 2012)

Malappuram district

Arts, Science, and Commerce colleges 
 Government College, Malappuram (est. 1972)
 Pookoya Thangal Memorial Government College, Perinthalmanna, Malappuram (est. 1975)
 Thunchan Memorial Government College, Tirur, Malappuram (est. 1980)
 Govt. Arts and Science College, Nilambur, Malappuram (est. 2018)
 N.S.S College, Manjeri, Malappuram (est. 1965)
 Dr. Gafoor Memorial MES Mampad College, Malappuram (est. 1965)
 Pocker Sahib Memorial Orphanage College (PSMO College), Malappuram (est. 1968)
 M.E.S. Ponnani College, Ponnani, Malappuram (est. 1968)
 Mar Thoma College, Chungathara, Malappuram (est. 1981)
 Korambayil Ahammed Haji Memorial Unity Women's College, Manjeri, Malappuram (est. 1981)
 MES Keveeyam College, Valanchery, Malappuram (est. 1981)
 EMEA College of Arts and Science, Kumminiparamba, Malappuram (est. 1983)
 Sullamussalam Science College, Areekode, Malappuram (est. 1995)
 Amal College of Advanced Studies, Nilambur (est. 2005)
 Majlis Arts & Science College Valanchery, Malappuram (est. 1995)
 SNDP Yogam Sathabdi Smaraka College (also SNDP YSS College) Perinthalmanna, Malappuram (est. 2002)
 HM College of Science & Technology, Manjeri, Malappuram (est. 2002)
 Markaz Arts & Science College, Malappuram (est. 2003)
 K.V. Ustad Memorial Darul Hidaya Orphanage Arts & Science College For Women, Kololamba, Malappuram (est. 2003)
 Sree Vivekananda Padana Kendram Arts & Science College, Edakkara, Malappuram (est. 2003)
 Regional College of Science and Humanities, Kuzhimanna, Malappuram (est. 2003)
 Najath College of Science and Technology, Malappuram (est. 2003)
 Grace Valley College of Arts & Science, Malappuram (est. 2003)
 Vedavyasa Institute of Arts & Science, Vazhayur, Malappuram  (est. 2005) – Disaffiliation Requested
 Assabah Arts and Science College, Valayamkulam, Malappuram (est. 2005)
 Kottakkal Farook Arts and Science College, Malappuram (est 2005)
 Khidmath Arts and Science College, Malappuram (est. 2005)
 SAFI Institute of Advanced Study, Vazhayur, Malappuram (est. 2005)
 Gems Arts & Science College, Ramapuram, Malappuram (est. 2008)
 Sree Sastha College, Malappuram (est. 2008)
 Ma'din Arts and Science College, Melmuri, Malappuram (est. 2008)
 Safa College of Arts and Science, Malappuram (est. 2009)
 Hikamiyya Arts & Science College, Pathiriyal, Malappuram (est. 2009)
 Ideal College for Advanced Studies, Thavanoor, Malappuram (est. 2010)
 Al Jamia Arts & Science College, Malappuram (est. 2010)
 St. Mary's College, Angadippuram, Malappuram (est. 2010)
 Blossom Arts & Science College, Kondotty, Malappuram   (est. 2011)
 Noble Women's College, Manjeri, Malappuram (est. 2011)
 Pravasi Arts & Science College, Malappuram (est. 2011)
 IKT Memorial Arts & Science College, Malappuram  (est. 2012)
 Priyadarsini Arts & Science College, Ernad, Malappuram  (est. 2012)
 Bafakhy Yatheem Khana Arts & Science College for Women, Malappuram  (est. 2012)
 CPA College of Arts and Science,  Puthanathani, Malappuram (est. 2012)
 MIC Arts & Science College, Valluvambram, Malappuram (est. 2012)
 Nasra College of Arts & Science, Thirurkad, Malappuram (est. 2012)
 ISS Arts & Science College, Perinthalmanna, Malappuram (est. 2012)
 CH Muhammed Koya Memorial Govt. Arts & Science College, Tanur, Malappuram (est. 2013)
 Sahya Arts and Science College, Wandoor, Malappuram (est. 2013)
 Panakkad Pookoya Thangal Memorial Arts & Science College, Vengara, Malappuram (est. 2013)
 Malabar College of Commerce & Science, Malappuram (est. 2013)
 Malabar College of Advanced Studies, Vengara, Malappuram (est. 2013) 
 Government Arts & Science College, Kondotty, Malappuram (est. 2013)
 Govt. Arts & Science College, Mankada, Kolathur, Malappuram (est. 2013)
 Eranad Knowledge City College of Commerce and Sciences, Manjeri, Malappuram 
 JM College of Arts & Science, Tirur, Malappuram
 Moulana College of Arts & Science & Commerce, Tirur, Malappuram (est. 2013)
 KMCT Arts & Science College, Kuttippuram, Malappuram (est. 2013)
 Fathima Arts & Science College, Nilambur, Malappuram
 MES Arts and Science College, Nilambur, Malappuram – no longer functioning 
 Mohammed Ali Shihab Thangal Memorial Arts and Science College (MSTM), Perinthalmanna, Malappuram 
 MES Arts and Science College, Perinthalmanna, Malappuram
 Government Arts and Science College, Post, Malappuram (est. 2014)
 Women's Islamiya Arts and Science College, Punnappala Post, Malappuram (est. 2014)
 M.T.M College of Arts, Science and Commerce, Ponnani Taluk, Malappuram (est. 2014)
 Ambedkar College of Arts and Science, Wandoor, Malappuram (est. 2014)
 KR's Sree Narayana College, Valanchery, Malappuram (est. 2014)
 Panakkad Mohamedali Shihab Thangal Arts and Science College, Nannambra, Malappuram (est. 2015)
 Vedavyasa College of Arts and Science, Eranad Taluk, Malappuram (est. 2015)
 Jamia Islamiya Arts and Science College, Manjeri, Malappuram (est. 2015)
 MAO College of Arts and Science, Elayur, Malappuram (est. 2015)
 Government Arts and Science College for Women, Downhill, Malappuram (est. 2015)
 Sayyid Muhammad Ali Shihab Thangal Memorial Arts and Science Women's College, Malappuram
 Luminous Arts and Science College, Malappuram 
 Ability Arts & Science College for Hearing Impaired, Valiyaparamba, Malappuram

College of Applied Sciences 
These colleges are managed by Institute of Human Resources Development (IHRD):

 College of Applied Science, Munduparamba, Malappuram (est. 1993)
college of applied science calicut (est 1993)
 College of Applied Sciences, Edappal, Malappuram (est. 2005)
 College of Applied Sciences, Vazhakkad, Malappuram (est. 2005)
 College of Applied Sciences, Ernad Taluk, Malappuram (est. 2010)
 Model Degree College, Parappanangadi, Malappuram (est. 2015)

Engineering, MBA, and MCA colleges 
 MES College of Engineering, Kuttippuram, Malappuram (est. 1994)
 MEA Engineering College, Perinthalmanna, Malappuram (est. 2002) 
 Vedavyasa Institute of Technology, Karadparamba, Malappuram (est. 2004)
 Devaki Amma's Guruvayurappan College of Architecture, Malappuram (est. 2010)
 Alsalama Institute of Architecture, Perinthalmanna, Malappuram (est. 2011)
 Cochin College of Engineering and Technology, Valanchery, Malappuram  (est. 2012)
 Talent Institute of Management Studies, Edappal, Malappuram (est. 2013)
 Eranad Knowledge City Technical Campus (EKC), Cherukulam, Manjeri, Malappuram
 Vedavyasa College of Architecture, Karadparamba, Malappuram (est. 2014)
 Eranad Knowledge City College of Architecture, Cherukulam, Manjeri, Malappuram (est. 2014)
 Talent Institute of Architecture, Malappuram (est. 2015)
 Monti International Institute of Management Studies, Angadippuram, Malappuram (est. 2015)

Training colleges 
 Markaz Training College, Karthala, Malappuram (est. 1995)
 MCT Training College, Melmuri, Malappuram (est. 1995)
 KPPM College of Teacher Education, Anakkayam, Malappuram (est. 2002)
 Devaki Amma Memorial College of Teacher Education, Chelembra, Malappuram (est. 2002)
 Kunhathumma Memorial College of Teacher Education, Valillapuzha, Malappuram (est. 2003)
 Sree Vivekananda College of Teacher Education, Edakkara, Malappuram (est. 2004)
 Moulana College of Teacher Education, Kuttayi, Malappuram (est. 2004)
 Farook B.Ed College, Kottakkal, Malappuram (est. 2004)
 Bafakhy Yatheemkhana B.Ed Training College, Kalpakanchery, Malappuram (est. 2004)
 Majma’a Training College, Kavanur, Malappuram (est. 2004)
 EMEA Training College, Kondotty, Malappuram (est. 2004)
 Sullamussalam College of Teacher Education, Malappuram (est. 2004)
 ISS College of Teacher Education, Perinthalmanna, Malappuram (est. 2006)
 M.I Training College, Malappuram (est. 2006)
 Darul Uloom Training College, Vazhakkad, Malappuram (est. 2006)

Law colleges 
 Bhavan's N.A. Palkhivala Academy for Advanced Legal Studies and Research (est. 2012)
 KMCT Law College, Valanchery, Malappuram (est. 2013)
 MCT College of Legal Studies, Melmuri, Malappuram (est. 2015)

Arabic / Oriental title colleges 
 Madeenathul Uloom Arabic College, Pulikkal, Malappuram (est. 1946)
 Ansar arabic college, Valavannur, Malappuram
 Darul Uloom Arabic College, Vazhakkad, Malappuram (est. 1973)
 Anvarul Islam Arabic College, Kizhuparamba, Malappuram (est. 1972)
 Sullamussalam Arabic College, Malappuram (est. 1949)
 Anwarul Islam Women's Arabic College Mongam, Malappuram (est. 1970)
 Isha – Athul Islam Arabic College, Parappanangadi, Malappuram (est. 2003)
 Falahiya Arabic College, Down Hill, Malappuram  (est. 2003)
 Al-Hidayath Arabic College, Malappuram (est. 2003)
 Assabah Arabic College, Malappuram (est. 2003)
 Ilahiya Arabic College, Tirurkad, Malappuram (est. 2010)
 KMMMO Arabic College, Thirurangadi, Malappuram (est. 2010)
 Jamia Nadawiyya Women's Arabic College, Edavanna, Malappuram (est. 2012)
 Shareeath College for Women, Thenhipalam, Malappuram
 Safa Arabic College, Pookkattiri, Edayur

Palakkad district

Science, bca, and Commerce colleges 
 Government Victoria College, Palakkad (est. 1888)
 Sree Neelakanta Government Sanskrit College Pattambi (est. 1911)
 Government College, Chittur, Palakkad (est. 1947)
 Chembai Memorial Government Music College, Palakkad (est. 2000)
 Govt. Arts and Science College, Nattukal, Palakkad 
 Rajiv Gandhi Memorial Govt Arts & Science College, Attappadi, Palakkad (est. 2012)
 NSS College, Ottapalam, Palakkad (est. 1961)
 Government Arts & Science College, Pathirippala, Palakkad
 Mercy College, Palakkad, (est. 1964)
 NSS College, Nenmara, Palakkad (est. 1967)
 MES Kalladi College, Mannarkkad, Palakkad (est. 1967)
 Sree Narayana College, Palakkad (est. 1970)
 MPMMSN Trust College, Shornur, Palakkad (est. 1981)
 Sreekrishnapuram VT Bhattathiripad College, Mannampatta, Palakkad (est. 1982)
 V V College of Science and Technology Kanjikode, Palakkad (est. 2002)
 Thunchath Ezhuthachan College, Palakkad (est. 2003)
 AWH College of Science and Technology, Anakkara, Palakkad (est. 2005)
 Yuvakshetra Institute of Management Studies (YIMS), Ezhakkad, Mundur, Palakkad (est. 2005)
 Minority Arts & Science College Padinharangadi, Palakkad (est. 2005)
 Mount Seena College of Arts & Science, Ottappalam, Palakkad (est. 2009)
 Cherpulassery College of Science and Technology for Women, Palakkad (est. 2010)
 MES College, Pattambi, Palakkad (est. 2011)
 Aspire College of Advanced Studies, Thrithala, Palakkad (est. 2012)
 Sadanam Kumaran College, Mankara, Palakkad (est. 2012)
 SNES Kallyani College, Karmpuzha, Ottapalam, Palakkad (est. 2013)
 Nethaji Memorial Arts & Science College, Nemmara, Palakkad (est. 2013)
 Sree Narayana Guru College of Advanced Studies, Alathur, Palakkad (est. 2013)
 Govt. Arts & Science College, Thrithala, Palakkad (est. 2013)
 Royal College of Arts & Science, Thrithala, Palakkad  (est. 2013)
 AMC Group of Educational Institutions, Ottapalam, Palakkad  (est. 2014)
 KSHM Arts & Science College, Edathanattukara, Palakkad  (est. 2014)
 Najath Arts & Science College, Mannarkkad, Palakkad (est. 2014)
 Universal College of Arts & Science, Mannarkkad, Palakkad (est. 2015)
 Bharathamatha College of Arts & Science, Kozhinjampara, Palakkad (est. 2015)
 Lement College of Advanced Studies, Mele Pattambi, Palakkad (est. 2015)
 Nucleus College of Arts & Science, Pattambi, Palakkad (est. 2015)
 Lions Educational Trust College, Alathur Taluk, Palakkad (est. 2015)
 The Elegant Arts & Science College, Kodunthirapully, Palakkad (est. 2015)
 N.S.S Arts and Science College, Parakulam, Palakkad
 Devamatha College of Advanced Studies, Kanjirapuzha, Palakkad
 SEEDAC College of Arts and Science, Mannarkkad, Palakkad
 St. Alphonsa College, Anamooli, Mannarkkad, Palakkad
 Ideal Arts & Science College, Cherpulassery, Palakkad

College of Applied Science 
 College of Applied Science, Vadakkencherry, Palakkad (est. 1993)
 College of Applied Science, Malampuzha, Kalleppully, Palakkad (est. 2008)
 College of Applied Science, Kuzhalmannam, Kottayi, Palakkad (est. 2008)
 College of Applied Science, Attappadi, Palakkad (est. 2010)
 College of Applied Science, Ayalur, Palakkad (est. 2012)

Engineering and MCA colleges 
 Govt. Engineering College, Sreekrishnapuram, Mannampatta, Palakkad (est. 1999)
 NSS College of Engineering, Akathethara, Palakkad (est. 1960)
 Al-Ameen Engineering College, Shornur, Palakkad (est. 2003)
 Jawaharlal College of Engineering and Technology, Palakkad (est. 2008)
 Prime College of Engineering, Palakkad (est. 2009)
 Sreepathy Institute of Management & Technology (SIMAT), Kootanad, Palakkad (est. 2009)
 Palakkad Institute of Science and Technology, Muthalamada, Palakkad (est. 2009)
 Ammini College of Engineering, Kannampariyaram, Mankara, Palakkad (est. 2010)
 Lead College of Management, Dhoni, Palakkad (est. 2010)
 Chathamkulam Institute of Research and Advanced Studies, Palakkad  (est. 2011)
 , Attayampathy, Kollengode (est. 2012), and recognized by the Council of Architecture (CoA).
 Ahalia School of Engineering & Technology, Kozhipara, Pudussery, Palakkad (est. 2012)
 Aryanet Institute of Technology, Vallikkad, Mundur, Palakkad (est. 2012)
 Global Institute of Architecture, Nagripuram. Pathiripala, Palakkad (est. 2013)
 Ahalia School of Management, Kozhippara, Palakkad (est. 2013)
 Nehru College of Architecture, Lakkidi, Mangalam, Palakkad (est. 2015)

Training colleges 
 NSS Training College, Ottappalam, Palakkad (est. 1960)
 Holy Family College of Education for Women, Palakkad (est. 1995)
 Sree Narayana College of Teacher Education, Sreekrishnapuram, Palakkad (est. 2002)
 Sree Swamy Vivekananda Centre of Teacher Education, Ottapalam, Palakkad (est. 2004)
 Ezhuthachan Training College, Mannapra, Palakkad (est. 2004)
 Salafiyya Training College, Vilayur, Palakkad (est. 2004)
 BSS B.Ed Training College, Alathur, Palakkad (est. 2005)
 M.E.S Kappungal Saydalavi Haji Memorial Training College, Edathanattukara, Palakkad (est. 2005)
 Ideal Training College, Cherpulassery, Palakkad (est. 2006)
 Sneha College of Teacher Education, Attayampathy, Govindapuram, Palakkad (est. 2006)
 Indu Memorial Teacher Training Centre, Kuzhalmannam, Palakkad (est. 2007)
 Bharatheeya Vidya Nikethan College of Teacher Education, Kallekad, Palakkad (est. 2009)

Arabic / Oriental title colleges 
 Salafiyya Arabic College, Karinganad, Palakkad (est. 2003)
 Markaz Oriental College, Ottapalam, Palakkad  (est. 2003)
 Islamiya Arabic College Alathur, Palakkad (est. 2003) – last CPA in 2009. No CPA since
 Al-Abrar Oriental Arabic College, Koduvalikkundu, Mannarkkad, Palakkad

Law colleges 
 V.R Krishnan Ezhuthachan Law College, Nanmara, Palakkad (est. 2014) – conditional affiliation
 Nehru Academy of Law, Lakkidi, Mangalam, Palakkad (est. 2015)
 Al-Ameen Law College, Kulappully, Shoranur, Palakkad (est. 2015)

Thrissur district

Arts, Science, and Commerce colleges 
 Christ College, Irinjalakuda, Thrissur (est. 1956)
 St. Thomas College, Thrissur (est. 1919 as college)
 St. Joseph's College, Irinjalakuda, Thrissur (est. 1964)
 Vimala College, Thrissur (estd. 1967)
 St. Aloysius College, Thrissur (est. 1968)
 Sree Kerala Varma College, Kanattukara, Thrissur  (est. 1947)
 St. Mary's College, Thrissur (est. 1946)
 Little Flower College, Guruvayoor, Thrissur (est. 1955)
 Sree Krishna College, Guruvayur, Thrissur (est. 1964)
 Sacred Heart College Chalakudy,  Thrissur (est. 1980)
 Carmel College, Mala, Thrissur (est. 1981)
 Sree Narayana College, Nattika, Thrissur (est. 1967)
 Prajyothi Niketan College,  Pudukad, Thrissur (est. 1995)
 Mar Dionysius College, Pazhanji, Thrissur (est. 1982)
 Sri C. Achutha Menon Government College, Kuttanellur, Thrissur (est. 1972)
 MES Asmabi College,  P. Vemballur, Thrissur (est. 1968)
 Sri Vyasa NSS College, Vyasagiri, Wadakkancherry, Thrissur (est. 1967)
 Sree Vivekananda College, Kunnamkulam, Thrissur (est. 1981)
 Government College of Fine Arts, Thrissur (est. 1910)
 Sree Rama Varma Govt. College of Music & Performing Arts, Thrissur (est. 1910)
 Don Bosco College, Mannuthy, Thrissur (est. 2005)
 Chetana College of Media and Performing Arts, Chiyyaram, Thrissur (est. 2015)
 St.Joseph's Arts and Science College, Pavaratty, Thrissur (est. 2015)
 Sahrdaya College of Advanced Studies for Arts and Science, Kodakara, Thrissur (est. 2011)
 Nirmala College of Arts and Science, Kunnappilly, Meloor, Chalakudy, Thrissur  (est. 2014)
 Govt. Arts & Science College, Ollur, Thrissur (est. 2014)
 Sree Narayana Guru College of Advanced Studies, Nattika, Chavakkad, Thrissur
 Panampilly Memorial Govt. College, Chalakkudy, Potta, Thrissur (est. 1975)
 KKTM Govt, College, Pullut, Thrissur (est. 1965) 
 Naipunnya Institute of Management & Information Technology, Koratty, Thrissur (est. 2002)
 Mother Arts & Science College, Peruvallu, Thrissur (est. 2002)
 A.C. Kunhumon Haji Memorial ICA College for Women's, Thrissur (est. 2002)
 Ansar Women's College, Perumpilavu, Thrissur (est. 2002)
 Tharananellur Arts and Science College, Irinjalakuda, Mukundapuram, Thrissur
 Paramekkavu College of Arts & Science, Ayyanthole, Thrissur
 St. Terasa's Arts & Science College, Mala, Thrissur
 Mar Osthatheos College, Perumpilavu, Thrissur
 Divine Institute of Media Science (DiMS), Muringoor, Thrissur
 Govt. Arts & Science College, Chelakkara, Thrissur
 Elims College of Arts and Science, Ponganakadu, Kurichikara, Thrissur (est. 2014)
 Sree Narayana Guru College of Advanced Studies, Vazhukumpara, Chuvannamannu, Thrissur (est. 2014)
 MET's College of Advanced Studies, Kurivilassery PO, Mala, Thrissur (est. 2015)
 Sree Gokulam College of Arts & Science, Pazhuvil West, Thrissur.
 Lakshmi Narayana Arts and Science College, Mayannur, Kondazhy, Thrissur

College of Physical Education 
 Christ College of Physical Education, Irinjalakuda, Thrissur (est. 2011)

College of Applied Sciences 
 College of Applied Sciences, Nattika, Thrissur (est. 2005)
 College of Applied Sciences, Chelakkara, Thrissur (est. 2008)
 College of Applied Sciences, Kodungallur, Thrissur (est. 2010)

Engineering, MBA, and MCA colleges 
 Government Engineering College, Thrissur (est. 1958)
 Christ College of Engineering, Irinjalakuda, Thrissur (est. 2015)
 Jyothi Engineering College, Cheruthuruthy, Thrissur (est. 2002)
 Sahrdaya College of Engineering and Technology, Kodakara, Thrissur (est. 2002)
 Thejus Engineering College, Thrissur (est. 2009)
 IES College of Engineering, Chittilappilly, Thrissur (est. 2003)
 Nirmala College of Engineering, Chalakudy, Thrissur (est. 2011)
 MET's School of Engineering, Mala, Thrissur (est. 2002)
 Nehru College of Engineering and Research Centre, Pampadi, Thrissur (est. 2002)
 Royal College of Engineering & Technology, Akkikkavu, Thrissur (est. 2003)
 Vidya Academy of Science and Technology, Thalakkottukara, Thrissur  (est. 2003)
 Institute of Management & Technology, Pottore, Thrissur (est. 2004)
 Elijah Institute of Management Studies, Kurichikkara, Thrissur (est. 2004)
 Holy Grace Academy of Management Studies, Mala, Thrissur (est. 2005)
 Malabar College of Engineering and Technology, Wadakkanchery, Thrissur (est. 2009)
 Holy Grace Academy of Engineering for Women, Mala, Thrissur (est. 2010)
 Sree Eranakulathappan College of Engineering and Management, Muppliyum, Thrissur (est. 2011)
 Universal Engineering College, Vallivattom, Konathukunnu, Kodungallur, Thrissur (est. 2011)
 IES College of Architecture, Chittilappilly, Thrissur (est. 2012)
 Naipunnya Institute of Management and Information Technology, Koratty, Thrissur
 MET’S School of Management Studies, Mala, Thrissur (est. 2013)
 Focus Institute of Science and Technology, Poomala, Thrissur (est. 2014)
 Thejus College of Architecture, Vellarakkad, Thrissur (est. 2014)
 Sahrdaya Institute of Management Studies, Kodakara, Thrissur  (est. 2015)

Law colleges 
 Government Law College, Thrissur
 Ambookan Ittoop Memorial (AIM) College of Law, Poyya, Mala, Thrissur

Training colleges 
 Institute of Advanced Study in Education (Govt.), Thrissur (est. 1945)
 St. Joseph's Training College, Pavaratty, Thrissur (est. 2004)
 JPE Training College, Koorkanchery, Thrissur (est. 1995)
 Jesus Training College, Mala, Thrissur (est. 1995)
 Navajyothi College of Teacher Education, Olarikkara, Thrissur (est. 2002)
 Euphrasia Training College, Irinjalakuda, Thrissur (est. 2004)
 Dr. Palpu Memorial SNDP Yogam College of Education, Kodungallur, Thrissur (est. 1995)
 Arafa Institute for Teacher Education, Attur, Thrissur (est. 2004)
 Sree Vivekananda Teacher Education Centre, Akkikavu, Thrissur (est. 2004)
 Ideal Educational Society Training College, Chittilappilly, Thrissur (est. 2004) – disaffiliated 
 Ansar Training College for Women, Karikkad, Thrissur (est. 2004)
 Mar Osthatheos Training College, Kunnamkulam, Thrissur (est. 2004)
 Hindi Prachara Kendra College of Teacher Education, Kodungallur, Thrissur (est. 2006)
 Vikram Sarabhai B.Ed College, Kaipamangalam, Thrissur (est. 2008)
 Namboodiris College of Teacher Education, Irinjalakuda, Thrissur (est. 2009)

Hindi / Oriental title colleges 
 Thaqwa Afzal-Ul-Ulama Arabic College (Women's’ Arabic College), Andathode, Thrissur (est. 2005)
 Busthanul Uloom Arabic College, Koprakalam, Kaipamangalam, Thrissur (est. 2014)

Wayanad district

Arts, science, and commerce
 NMSM Government College, Kalpetta, Wayanad (est. 1981)
 St Mary's College, Sulthan Bathery, Wayanad (est. 1965)
 Pazhassi Raja College, Pulpally, Bathery(est. 1982)
 WMO Arts & Science College, Kalpetta, Wayanad (est. 1995)
 Oriental School of Hotel Management, Lakkidi, Wayanad (est. 2004)
 Oriental College of Hotel Management and Culinary Arts, Vythiri, Wayanad (est. 2005)
 Don Bosco College, Sultan Bathery, Wayanad (est. 2005)
 CM College of Arts and Science Nadavayal, Wayanad (est. 2009)
 SNDP Yogam Arts & Science College, Pulpally, Wayanad (est. 2010)
 Alphonsa Arts & Science College, Sultan Bathery, Wayanad (est. 2013)
 Jayasree Arts and Science College, Kalanadikolli, Pulpally, Wayanad (est. 2015)
 Eldho Mor Baselios College, Meenangadi, Wayanad (est. 2015)
 Model College, Meenangadi, Wayanad (est. 2010)

Training colleges
 Mar Baselious College of Teacher Education, Sultan Bathery, Wayanad (est. 2004)
 K. Raghavan Memorial College of Teacher Educatio, Pulpally, Wayanad (est. 2004)
 St. Gregorios Teacher Training College,  Meenangadi, Wayanad (est. 2005)

Arabic / Oriental title colleges
 Markaz Wayanad Women's College, Sultan Bathery, Wayanad (est. 2013)
 Darunnajath Arabic College, Karuvarakundu, Malappuram

Lakshadweep
 Government Jawaharlal Nehru College, Lakshadweep
 Mahatma Gandhi College, Lakshadweep
 P. M. Sayeed Calicut University Centre, Andrott

Notes

References

External links
University of Calicut
University Grants Commission
National Assessment and Accreditation Council

 
Calicut
Calicut
Affiliates